Meghna Bridge is a road bridge in Bangladesh. It was built with the assistance of Japan and officially named Japan Bangladesh Friendship Bridge 1, but it is popularly known as Meghna Bridge. According to a study conducted in 2004 by the Embassy of Japan in Bangladesh, residents living around the Meghna Bridge recognized several positive impacts after the construction of the bridge.

Location
The bridge is located along the Dhaka–Chittagong Highway.

History
Meghna Bridge was built with the financial help from the Government of Japan. It was constructed by the Nippon Koei Co. Ltd., (an independent engineering consulting firm in Japan that has been involved in projects in more than 80 countries). The bridge was opened on February 1, 1991.Meghna Bridge is the single largest project with Japanese assistance in the world.

In 2005, the bridge underwent extensive repair because the expansion joints of the bridge were damaged due to the lack of appropriate maintenance. In 2012-13, the bridge underwent even more extensive repair because the expansion joints of the bridge were damaged due to the lack of appropriate maintenance. Also piers were protected from scour at river bed.

Architecture
Meghna Bridge is a cantilever and girder bridge. The bridge has thirteen spans. The foundations are supported on RCC caissons and piles. Piled foundation of abutments are buried. RCC caissons which are used as foundation under the piers are also buried. Both abutments and the piers of the bridge are RCC solid type. The piers of the bridge are hexagonal.

The wing walls of the bridge are of RCC and are fixed with abutments and have no weep holes. Railing type of the bridge is of R.C.C post and steel rail. Meghna Bridge also has infrastructure of drainage.

Economic impact
Traffic volumes across the Meghna River and of National Highway No. 1 significantly increased after the opening of the Meghna Bridge. In April 1997, an average of 10,149 vehicles of all types used the bridge in each 24 hours while March 2004 saw 9,704 vehicles per day. The reason behind this fall in traffic volume is attributed to increase in toll rate in 2002 and seasonal fluctuations. Below is a comparison of vehicles using the bridge per day in April 1997 and March 2004:

The survey conducted in 2004 by the Embassy of Japan in Bangladesh found that a majority of the users of the bridge believe that the construction of the Meghna Bridge improved the life of the people living near it and the surrounding area of the bridge has been urbanized. The people surveyed opined that the number of traffic blockage caused by bad weather has been decreased since the construction. The survey also found that 42% of the trucks using Meghna Bridge transport goods between Dhaka and Chittagong.

References

Road bridges in Bangladesh
Toll bridges in Bangladesh
Bangladesh–Japan relations